Shaver Creek may refer to:

 Shaver Creek (Missouri)
 Shaver Creek (Pennsylvania)